Katrina Kittle is an American novelist from Dayton, Ohio. She is an alumna of Ohio University, where she earned degrees in English and Education, and Spalding University, where she earned an MFA. She was a middle school teacher at The Miami Valley School, and an English teacher at Centerville High School. She currently works at the Miami Valley Fair Housing Center on a part-time basis, which allows her time to write. She is the author of several novels, including Traveling Light (2000), Two Truths and a Lie (2001), The Kindness of Strangers (2006), The Blessings of the Animals (2010), and Reasons to Be Happy (2011). Traveling Light and Two Truths and a Lie were released by Warner Books, and The Kindness of Strangers was released by William Morrow. A softcover edition of The Kindness of Strangers was released in 2007.

Much of Kittle's work deals with large, often overwhelming issues and their effects on individuals or families. Traveling Light is about a woman coming to terms with her brother's AIDS diagnosis, and The Kindness of Strangers is about child sexual abuse.

Kittle is represented by Lisa Bankoff of International Creative Management. Her current publisher is HarperCollins. Kittle frequently appears at the Antioch Writers' Workshop in Yellow Springs, Ohio, an annual week-long high-intensity writing workshop.

Books
Traveling Light: Published June 1, 2001 by Warner Books (NY)

Summary: A dancer turned schoolteacher, Summer is still recovering from the injury that ended her promising career in the arts. Her lover, Nicholas, fears she's depending on him to fulfill her remaining dreams and hopes. And, most ominously of all, her cherished brother, Todd, is slowly dying. In the tranquil suburbs of Ohio, as these difficult days crawl forward, Summer will come to terms with life, death, relationships, and her father's enigmatic, long-ago injunction to "travel light". She will learn that true love transcends all illness, distrust, and the cruelty of time. But it is in trying to fulfill a promise made to her brother long ago that Summer will meet her greatest challenge -- and realize how truly fortunate she is.

Two Truths and a Lie: Published June 20, 2001 by Warner Books (NY)

Alice Hoffman meets Janet Evanovich in this poignant and suspenseful second novel from the author of "Traveling Light". Dair Canard has made up tales since she was a child, but eventually all the lies come tumbling down after the mysterious death of a friend.

The Kindness of Strangers: Published January 2, 2007 by William Morrow Paperbacks

Summary: A young widow raising two boys, Sarah Laden is struggling to keep her family together. But when a shocking revelation rips apart the family of her closest friend, Sarah finds herself welcoming yet another troubled young boy into her already tumultuous life.
Jordan, a quiet, reclusive elementary school classmate of Sarah's son Danny, has survived a terrible ordeal. By agreeing to become Jordan's foster mother, Sarah will be forced to question the things she has long believed. And as the delicate threads that bind their family begin to unravel, all the Ladens will have to face difficult truths about themselves and one another—and discover the power of love necessary to forgive and to heal.

The Blessings of the Animals: Published August 3, 2010

Veterinarian Cami Anderson has hit a rough patch. Stymied by her recent divorce, she wonders if there are secret ingredients to a happy, long-lasting marriage or if the entire institution is outdated and obsolete. Couples all around her are approaching important milestones. Her parents are preparing to celebrate their fiftieth anniversary. Her brother and his partner find their marriage dreams legally blocked. Her former sister-in-law—still her best friend—is newly engaged. The youthfully exuberant romance of her teenage daughter is developing complications. And three separate men—including her ex-husband—are becoming entangled in Cami's messy post-marital love life. But as she struggles to come to terms with her own doubts amid this chaotic circus of relationships, Cami finds strange comfort in an unexpected confidant: an angry, unpredictable horse in her care. With the help of her equine soul mate, she begins to make sense of marriage's great mysteries—and its disconnects.

Reasons to Be Happy: Published October 1, 2011

REASONS TO BE HAPPY

21. Cat purr vibrating through your skin. 22. Jumping on a trampoline in the rain. 23. Raw cookie dough. 24. Getting yourself all freaked out after a scary movie. 25. Dancing like an idiot when no one is watching.

What happened to the girl who wrote those things? I miss that girl. She used to be bold and fun. Now she's a big chicken loser. How could so much change so fast? Let's see, you could be the plain Jane daughter of two gorgeous famous people, move to a new school, have no real friends, and your mom could get sick, and, oh yeah, you could have the most embarrassing secret in the world. Yep, that about does it. So, the real question is, how do I get that girl back?

Morning in This Broken World: A Novel: Expected Publication Date June 20, 2023 by Lake Union Publishing

Grieving but feisty widow Vivian Laurent is at a late-in-life crossroads. The man she loved is gone. Their only daughter is estranged and missing. And the assisted-living facility where her husband died is going into quarantine. Living in lockdown with only heartache and memories is something Vivian can’t bear. Then comes a saving grace. Luna, a compassionate nursing assistant and newly separated mother, is facing eviction. Vivian has a plan that could turn their lives around: return to her old home and invite Luna and her two children to move in with her. With the exuberant eleven-year-old Wren in her hot-pink motorized wheelchair and Wren’s troubled older brother, Cooper, the new housemates make for an unlikely pandemic pack, weathering the coming storm together. Now it’s time to heal old wounds, make peace with the past, find hope and joy, and discover that the strongest bonds can get anyone through the worst of times.

References

External links
 Official site
 Katrina Kittle author page on Goodreads

American women novelists
Living people
Writers from Dayton, Ohio
Year of birth missing (living people)
20th-century American novelists
21st-century American novelists
Ohio University alumni
Spalding University alumni
20th-century American women writers
21st-century American women writers
Novelists from Ohio